Sydney Jagbir (28 January 1913 – 16 October 1986) was a Trinidadian cricketer. He played in seven first-class matches for Trinidad and Tobago from 1934 to 1952.

See also
 List of Trinidadian representative cricketers

References

External links
 

1913 births
1986 deaths
Trinidad and Tobago cricketers